For most of its history, Pothohar Plateau was dominated by Gakhars and Khokhars tribes. Following is the list of known rulers of Pothohar Plateau:

List

References 

History of Pakistan
Lists of names